World Intellectual Property Day is observed annually on April 26. The event was established by the World Intellectual Property Organization (WIPO) in 2000 to "raise awareness of how patents, copyright, trademarks and designs impact on daily life" and "to celebrate creativity, and the contribution made by creators and innovators to the development of economies and societies across the globe". April 26 was chosen as the date for World Intellectual Property Day because it coincides with the date on which the Convention Establishing the World Intellectual Property Organization entered into force in 1970. World Intellectual Property Day is WIPO’s largest intellectual property (IP) public outreach campaign.

History 

In a statement to the 33rd Session of the Assemblies of the Member States of WIPO in September 1988, the Director General of the National Algerian Institute for Industrial Property (INAPI) “suggested that an International Intellectual Property Day be instituted." In a subsequent letter to the WIPO Director General dated April 7 1999, Mr. Amor Bouhnik, Director General of INAPI noted that the aim of establishing such a day "would be to set up a framework for broader mobilization and awareness, to open up access to the promotional aspect of innovation and to recognize the achievements of promoters of intellectual property throughout the world."

On August 9, 1999, in a letter from Jiang Ying, Commissioner of the State Intellectual Property Office of the People’s Republic of China, the Chinese delegation proposed "that WIPO adopt the commemoration of its 30th anniversary of founding (26 April) as the “World Intellectual Property Day," as an annual event. The Commissioner noted that the aim of doing so was “to further promote the awareness of intellectual property protection, expand the influence of intellectual property protection across the world, urge countries to publicize and popularize intellectual property protection laws and regulations, enhance the public legal awareness of intellectual property rights, encourage invention-innovation activities in various countries and strengthen international exchange in the intellectual property field."

In October 1999, at its 26th session, the General Assembly of WIPO approved the idea of declaring a particular day as a World Intellectual Property Day.

Engagement by WIPO’s member states in World Intellectual Property Day has risen since its inception in 2000. In its first year, member states from 59 countries reported official World Intellectual Property Day events. Five years later, in 2005, 110 countries reported official World Intellectual Property Day events, and in 2022, the campaign attracted users from 189 member states.

World Intellectual Property Day events around the world 

Every year hundreds of events are organized around the world by IP offices, law firms, private companies, students and others to celebrate inventors and creators and to promote understanding about the intellectual property system and its associated rights (e.g. copyrights, trademarks, patents, design rights, trade secrets, plant variety rights).

World Intellectual Property Day events are an opportunity to explore different aspects of the intellectual property system and how innovators, creators and businesses can use it to add value to their ingenuity and creativity. It is also an opportunity shine a light on the IP system’s role in supporting economic, social and cultural development for the benefit of everyone, everywhere. At its core, the IP system seeks to balance the interests of inventors and creators with those of the general public through the grant of time-limited rights that meet pre-established conditions as set out in international treaties negotiated by WIPO’s member states.

During the period in which the rights are valid (this varies according to the right concerned), the holder of that right holds exclusive rights. This means they may determine who may or may not exploit their work and the terms under which they may do so. After that time-period has lapsed, the IP-protected work falls into the public domain and may be used by anyone without the obligation to first seek permission from the rights owner. WIPO’s role is to lead the development of a balanced intellectual property system.The laws governing intellectual property at the international level are enshrined in various international treaties administered by WIPO. These international treaties have been negotiated by member states since the emergence of the international IP system in 1883 following the conclusion of the Paris Convention for the International Protection of Industrial Property. The so-called Paris Convention and the Berne Convention for the Protection of Literary and Artistic Works, concluded in 1886, are the pillars of the international IP system and the foundations of the International Bureaux for the Protection of Intellectual Property (BIRPI), the organization, which preceded WIPO before the entry into force of the Convention establishing WIPO in 1970.

While World Intellectual Property Day is celebrated every year on April 26, many countries hold their World Intellectual Property Day celebrations on another date. Some, including Peru and Singapore, organize a World Intellectual Property Day week, while others, such as Algeria, roll events out over a month. While WIPO identifies a theme and produces a range of promotional materials around that theme, each country may develop its own national campaign in line with local needs.

For World Intellectual Property Day 2022, nearly 600 World Intellectual Property Day events were recorded across the globe on topical issues relating to the campaign theme IP and Youth: Innovating for a Better Future, ranging from the protection of comics in Peru, to IP and the blockchain. World Intellectual Property Day is also an opportunity for leading policymakers to express their support for World Intellectual Property Day and to highlight the relevance of intellectual property to regional and national economic development.

World Intellectual Property Day 2022 also featured a panel discussion on Innovating for Better Health: Supporting Young Innovators through IP, was organized in collaboration with the International Federation of Pharmaceutical Manufacturers & Associations (IFPMA) with the support of the Geneva Health Forum and Speak UP Africa. The event brought together young innovators/entrepreneurs and mentors from Cameroon, Colombia, Nepal, Uganda, and the Philippines as well as various international experts. It was followed by a musical program featuring music from: 
Anaïs – An acoustic singer, multi-instrumentalist with an indie folk sound and jazz influences.
Kathyta Fuentes – A Chilean singer and founder of the musical group SUYAI, whose repertoire is inspired by the Latin American Folklorika.
LUVANGA - An amapiano artist who blends hip-hop, afrobeats, house, and pop melodies to explore Afro-diasporic sonic futurities; and
Stogie-T – A Tanzanian-born, South African hip-hop pioneer whose uncompromising lyricism continues to speak truth to power.

World Intellectual Property Day 2022 also featured the first World Intellectual Day Youth Video Competition.

In the Report of the Director General Daren Tang to the Assemblies of WIPO in July 2022, WIPO Director General said, I am also happy to report that this year's World Intellectual Property Day attracted record global engagement. Themed around ‘IP and Youth: Innovating for a Better Future’, we recorded over 15 million impressions across our digital platforms and there were nearly 600 World Intellectual Property Day events across 189 Member States, our largest participation ever.

Themes
Each year, the campaign is rolled out around a topical theme:
 2023  – Women and IP: Accelerating Innovation and Creativity
 2022 – IP and Youth: Innovating for a Better Future
 2021 – IP and SMEs: Taking Your Ideas to Market
2020 – Innovate for a Green Future
 2019 – Reach for Gold: IP and Sports
 2018 – Powering Change: Women in Innovation and Creativity
 2017 – Innovation – Improving Lives
 2016 – Digital Creativity: Culture Reimagined.
 2015 – Get Up, Stand Up. For Music.
 2014 – Movies – a Global Passion
 2013 – Creativity – The Next Generation
 2012 – Visionary Innovators
 2011 – Designing the Future
 2010 – Innovation – Linking the World
 2009 – Green Innovation
 2008 – Celebrating innovation and promoting respect for intellectual property
 2007 – Encouraging Creativity
 2006 – It Starts with an Idea
 2005 – Think, Imagine, Create
 2004 – Encouraging Creativity
 2003 – Make Intellectual Property Your Business
 2002 – Encouraging Creativity
 2001 – Creating the Future Today

Criticism 
This event has been criticized by a number of activists and scholars as one-sided propaganda in favor of traditional copyright, ignoring alternatives related to copyleft and the free culture movement. 
Mike Masnick of Techdirt wrote that World Intellectual Property Day is intended "to promote ever greater protectionism and mercantilism in favor of copyright holders and patent holders, while ignoring any impact on the public of those things. It's a fairly disgusting distortion of the claimed intent of intellectual property." Zak Rogoff of the Defective by Design noted that it is a "global but decidedly not grassroots event". It has also been criticized by activists from civil society organizations such as IP Justice and the Electronic Information for Libraries who consider it one-sided propaganda as the marketing materials associated with the event, provided by WIPO, "come across as unrepresentative of other views and events". Michael Geist, a law professor at the University of Ottawa, noted that "World Intellectual Property Day has become little more than a lobbyist day". Cushla Kapitzk from the Queensland University of Technology wrote that most of the WIPO's statements related to promotion of the World Intellectual Property Day are "either exaggerated or unsubstantiated"; noting that for example one of WIPO's claims used to promote this event, namely that "copyright helps bring music to our ears and art, films and literature before our eyes" is "tenuous at best, and lexical association of copyright with things recognised as having social and cultural value ('art', 'film' and 'literature') functions to legitimate its formulation and widespread application".

A number of grassroots-supported observances in opposition of prevalent IP laws celebrated by the World Intellectual Property Day exist, none of them supported by WIPO:

Culture Freedom Day
Document Freedom Day
Hardware Freedom Day
International Day Against DRM
Public Domain Day
Software Freedom Day

See also 
Free culture
Inventors' Day
World Book and Copyright Day
International Women's Day
World Radio Day

References

External links 
 World Intellectual Property Day at the World Intellectual Property Organization (WIPO)
 
 Heroes and villains of World Intellectual Property Day on Out-Law.com

April observances
Intellectual property law
Intellectual Property day, World
Recurring events established in 2000